Zuoying District is a district of Kaohsiung City in southern Taiwan. Zuoying District has the most populous village in Taiwan: Fushan Village.

History
Zuoying was established in the mid-seventeenth century as a military fortress, known as Old Fengshan (鳳山, also Old Fongshan). 'Sa-ei' is the Japanese On'yomi (Chinese reading) of the city's name in Chinese characters, but was romanized as 'Tsoying' after World War II by American Naval Consultants.

Geography

Zuoying's Lotus Lake is one of the major tourist attractions of southern Taiwan. This beautiful man-made lake is situated between Gueishan (Turtle Mountain) and Panpingshan (Half-screen Mountain). The Spring and Autumn Pavilions, Dragon and Tiger Pagodas and Confucius Temple dot its shoreline. The Confucius Temple is the largest Confucius temple in Taiwan.  The historic gates of the Old Fengshan city wall are also nearby.

There is a mountain called Shoushan or Chaishan (referred to as Monkey Mountain by many English-speakers), with a large population of Formosan macaques and many tropical plants, and part of which lies within the restricted area of the naval base.

 Area: 
 Population: 196,003 (January 2023)

Administrative divisions

The district consists of Jinxue, Weixi, Dingbei, Zhongbei, Zhongnan, Miaotung, Miaobei, Weinan, Weibei, Bingshan, Xianghe, Yongqing, Juguang, Guanghui, Gequn, Mingjian, Dingxi, Shenghou, Shengxi, Shengnan, Chengnan, Lutung, Bubei, Bunan, Beixi, Beibei, Beitung, Haisheng, Chongshi, Zizhu, Guomao, Guohui, Guofeng, Xinxia, Xinshang, Xinzhong, Xinguang, Caigong and Fushan Village.

Naval Base

Zuoying hosts the Zuoying Naval Airfield (22°42′16″N, 120°16′48″E) and the Republic of China Navy's Zuoying Naval Yard, Taiwan's largest naval base. Villages near the naval base are composed of single-story houses, uncommon in most Taiwanese cities. The villages were first populated by soldiers of the Kuomintang who came from different provinces of mainland China and gathered here after losing the Chinese Civil War in 1949. The ROC National Government provided these veteran serviceman with these single-story houses. These residential areas belonged to the navy and were under military control at that time. Therefore, people outside could not enter villages without martial permission. Without interference from outside, the culture of villages embodies that of different provinces of mainland China.

Education

Military academies
 Republic of China Naval Academy

Schools
 Kaohsiung American School
 Kaohsiung Municipal Tsoying Senior High School

Tourist attractions
 Banping Lake Wetland Park
 Chi Ming Palace
 Cide Palace
 Cih Ji Palace
 Dragon and Tiger Pagodas
 Guomao Community
 Kaohsiung Arena
 Kaohsiung Confucius Temple
 Lotus Pond
 National Sports Training Center
 Old City of Zuoying
 Qing Shui Temple
 Ruifeng Night Market
 Spring and Autumn Pavilions
 Zhouzai Wetland Park

Transportation

There are two stops on the West Coast Line of the Taiwan Railways Administration that serve Zuoying District: Zuoying–Jiucheng Station and Xinzuoying Station.

The Taiwan High Speed Rail (THSR) serves the Kaohsiung metropolitan area with Zuoying HSR station, currently the terminal and a joint station with TRA's Xinzuoying Station and KMRT's Zuoying Station.

Notable natives
 Chu Ke-liang former comedian
 Jeannie Hsieh, singer-songwriter, dancer, actress and model
 Lin Chuan, Premier of the Republic of China (2016-2017)

References

External links

 
 Taiwan High Speed Rail Corporation (HSR Zuoying Station)
 (English)
 GlobalSecurity.org (Zuoying Naval Base)
 Federation of American Scientists (Zuoying Airfield)